The Symphonicity Tour was a worldwide concert tour by musician Sting in support of his album Symphonicities, which was released in 2010. He was accompanied by the Royal Philharmonic Orchestra. The concerts themselves featured material from the album as well as several hits from his solo career and The Police.

Tour dates

Festivals and other miscellaneous performances
This concert was a part of "Ravinia Festival"
This concert was a part of "2011 Viña del Mar International Song Festival"
This concert was a part of "Moon & Stars Festival"
This concert was a part of "Montreux Jazz Festival"
This concert was a part of "Les Nuits de Fourvière"
This concert was a part of "Festival de Poupet"
This concert was a part of "Festival de Nîmes"
This concert was a part of "Monte Carlo Sporting Club Summer Festival"
This concert was a part of "Mawazine Festival"

References

External links
 Official site with setlists and reviews of each concert
 Fansite

2010 concert tours
2011 concert tours
Sting (musician) concert tours